Cochylimorpha nodulana is a species of moth of the family Tortricidae. It is found in Russia (Sarepta, Uralsk, Tuva), Kazakhstan, northern Syria, Armenia, Mongolia and Iran.

The wingspan is 21–23 mm. Adults have been recorded from wing in August.

References

Moths described in 1835
Cochylimorpha
Moths of Asia